The Colonies may refer to:
The colonies of the British Empire
The Thirteen Colonies founded in North America which became the United States
A joking nickname for the present-day United States

See also 
 Colony (disambiguation)